Levixone is a Ugandan gospel musician.

See also 

List of Ugandan musicians

References

External links 
"All Levixone Music"
"Levixone and Daisy Ejang with new single "SHUGA"."
"American Gospel rapper Da Truth coming for Phat Fest"

1993 births
21st-century Ugandan male singers
Ugandan gospel musicians
Living people